El Porvenir District is one of eleven districts of the province Trujillo in Peru.

Festivals
International Calzaferia El Porvenir is an annual footwear fair and in 2012 had its 10th.  It is held in El Porvenir city.

References